Valene Kane is a Northern Irish actress. She is perhaps best known for her performances in all three series of BBC Two's BAFTA-nominated The Fall, in which she played Jamie Dornan's first lover, Rose Stagg.

Early life
Kane was born and raised in Newry, County Down. She is the daughter of former footballer and coach Val Kane. From the age of 15, she was part of the National Youth Theatre, most notably starring in their production of 20 Cigarettes. She left Northern Ireland for London at 18 and trained at the Central School of Speech and Drama.

Career

Kane was cast in The Fading Light by the director Ivan Kavanagh after he spotted her in a short film, July, that was posted on YouTube. She was chosen partly for her successful experience with improvisation in the short film. 2013 saw her play Rose Stagg in the BBC's TV series The Fall, and Dara in the comic Irish thriller Jump. Also in 2013, Kane played the title role in Strindberg's Miss Julie at the newly founded Reading Rep.

Other film work Still Early, a short film which premiered at the Galway Film Festival. Kane's work for the BBC in 2016 includes taking the lead in BBC Three drama Thirteen, the third series of The Fall, and an episode of Murder. Also that year, she played Lyra Erso, the protagonist's mother, in the film Rogue One: A Star Wars Story.

Kane has been seen on stage as Nance, in the Finborough Theatre's production of Autumn Fire, The Love in Punchdrunk's production The Black Diamond, which sold out "in mere minutes" and Lady Lydia Languish in The Rivals. She also played Girleen in Martin McDonagh's The Lonesome West in which one reviewer said "Kane gives Girleen a schoolgirl reality, her confident swagger and challenge covering the only genuine feelings for anyone else that the play possesses".

Kane's radio drama work for the BBC includes The Demon Brother and Stroma Sessions for which she won Best Supporting Performer.

In 2018 Valene Kane played journalist Amy Whittaker who investigates the recruitment of young European women by ISIS in the 2018 thriller film Profile by Timur Bekmambetov. The film takes place entirely on computer screens. It premiered at the 68th Berlin International Film Festival where it won the Panorama Audience Award.

2019 saw Kane in Anne Sewitsky's Sonja: The White Swan which premiered at Sundance Film Festival and in BBC TV Movie Counsel in which she played "an alpha female barrister [who] complicates her professional and personal life when she takes on a young client"

Kane could also be heard on the Monobox Speech Share podcast reading from Marina Carr's "Portia Coughlan".

Filmography

Television

Film

Accolades

Press
The Independent described her performance in The Fall as "the standout performance" of Series 2; "harrowing to watch and completely convincing"

Her role as Lyra Erso in Rogue One: A Star Wars Story saw Kane and on-screen husband Mads Mikkelsen battle with Ben Mendelsohn's "Director Krennic" after desperately seeking help from Forest Whitaker's "Saw Gerrera"

In BBC Three's kidnap drama Thirteen, she starred opposite Jodie Comer as Detective Lisa Merchant in a performance described as "superb" by 'The Radio Times': "The former star of The Fall's scenes [...] are among the show's most intriguing, simmering with sexual tension and professional frustration."

Kane recently won 'Best Actress in a Lead Role' at the Sherman Oaks Film Festival 2019 for her performance as "a mother [who] refuses to bend to society's mores even in the face of unspeakable tragedy" in First Person: A Film About Love. and won the BBC Audio Drama Award for Best Supporting Performer for her role in The Stroma Sessions.

The film Profile, in which she played a struggling undercover journalist who connects with a Jihadi through Facebook, won the Panorama Audience Award at the 68th Berlin International Film Festival.

Awards and nominations

References

External links
 
 The Fading Light official website
 Culture Northern Ireland
 Best Irish Film 2010 award
 Review of The Fading Light - 'Irish Times'
 Review of Autumn fire - 'The Guardian'
 Independent Article 2021

Film actresses from Northern Ireland
Irish actresses
Living people
1987 births
National Youth Theatre members
People from Newry
21st-century actresses from Northern Ireland